The 1978–79 Eastern Kentucky Colonels basketball team represented Eastern Kentucky University during the 1978–79 NCAA Division I men's basketball season. The Colonels, led by second-year head coach Ed Byhre, played their home games at McBrayer Arena within Alumni Coliseum and were members of the East Division of the Ohio Valley Conference. They finished the season 21–8, 9–3 in OVC play to finish in first place. They were champions of the OVC tournament to earn an automatic bid to the NCAA tournament where they lost in the opening round to No. 8 seed Tennessee.

Roster

Schedule and results

|-
!colspan=9 style=| Regular season

|-
!colspan=9 style=| Ohio Valley Conference tournament

|-
!colspan=9 style=| NCAA tournament

References

Eastern Kentucky Colonels men's basketball seasons
Eastern Kentucky
Eastern Kentucky